İpek Soylu was the defending champion, however due to the violent situation in Turkey caused by the 2016 Turkish coup d'état attempt, the tournament was abandoned in the semifinal stage. 

Soylu, Lina Gjorcheska, Sofia Shapatava and Nina Stojanović were the four remaining semifinalists who were unable to continue the tournament.

Seeds

Main draw

Finals

Top half

Bottom half

References 
 Main draw

Bursa Cup - Singles
Bursa Cup